Waheed Asghar Dogar is a Pakistani politician who was a Member of the Provincial Assembly of the Punjab, from 2002 to 2007 and again from May 2013 and May 2018.

Early life and education
He was born on 4 March 1958 in Chichawatni.

He has a degree of Bachelor of Arts and a degree of Bachelor of Laws which he obtained in 1986 from Punjab University Law College.

Political career

He was elected to the Provincial Assembly of the Punjab as an independent candidate from Constituency PP-224 (Sahiwal-V) in 2002 Pakistani general election. He received 26,704 votes and defeated Shahzad Saeed Cheema, a candidate of Pakistan Muslim League (Q) (PML-Q).

He ran for the seat of the Provincial Assembly of the Punjab as an independent candidate from Constituency PP-224 (Sahiwal-V) in 2008 Pakistani general election but was unsuccessful. He received 28,357 votes and lost the seat to Shahzad Saeed Cheema, a candidate of Pakistan Peoples Party.

He was re-elected to the Provincial Assembly of the Punjab as a candidate of Pakistan Tehreek-e-Insaf from Constituency PP-224 (Sahiwal-V) in 2013 Pakistani general election.

References

Living people
Punjab MPAs 2013–2018
Punjab MPAs 2002–2007
1958 births
People from Chichawatni
Punjab University Law College alumni
Pakistan Tehreek-e-Insaf politicians